Nebria darlingtoni is a species of ground beetle from Nebriinae subfamily that is endemic to the US state of  California.

References

danmanni
Beetles described in 1979
Beetles of North America
Endemic fauna of California
Fauna without expected TNC conservation status